New orthodoxy may refer to:

 Neo-orthodoxy
 Neo-orthodox Jews
 Neo-Orthodox Movement (Eastern Orthodox Churches)